Chamrauli may refer to following places in India :-

 Chamrauli, Barauli Ahir
 Chamrauli, Chamba
 Chamrauli, Fatehabad
 Chamrauli, Shikohabad
 Chamrauli, Unnao